The moth genus Dryopteris is now considered a junior synonym of Oreta.

Dryopteris , commonly called the wood ferns, male ferns (referring in particular to Dryopteris filix-mas), or buckler ferns, is a fern genus in the family Dryopteridaceae, subfamily Dryopteridoideae, according to the Pteridophyte Phylogeny Group classification of 2016 (PPG I). There are about 300-400 species in the genus. The species are distributed in Asia, the Americas, Europe, Africa, and the Pacific islands, with the highest diversity in eastern Asia. It is placed in the family Dryopteridaceae, subfamily Dryopteridoideae, according to the Pteridophyte Phylogeny Group classification of 2016 (PPG I). Many of the species have stout, slowly creeping rootstocks that form a crown, with a vase-like ring of fronds. The sori are round, with a peltate indusium. The stipes have prominent scales.

Hybridization and polyploidy are well-known phenomena in this group, with many species formed via these processes. The North American Dryopteris hybrid complex is a well-known example of speciation via allopolyploid hybridization.

Selected species
The genus has a large number of species. Some genera sunk into Dryopteris, such as Dryopsis, Stenolepia and Nothoperanema, are distinguished by other sources.

Dryopteris abbreviata
Dryopteris aemula – hay-scented buckler fern
Dryopteris affinis – scaly male fern
Dryopteris alpestris
Dryopteris amurensis
Dryopteris apicisora
Dryopteris arguta – coastal wood fern
Dryopteris azorica
Dryopteris backeri
Dryopteris barbigera
Dryopteris bissetiana
Dryopteris blandfordii
Dryopteris bodinieri
Dryopteris borreri
Dryopteris cambrensis – narrow male fern
Dryopteris campyloptera – mountain wood fern
Dryopteris canaliculata
Dryopteris carthusiana – narrow buckler fern
Dryopteris caucasica
Dryopteris caudifrons
Dryopteris celsa – log fern
Dryopteris championii
Dryopteris changii
Dryopteris chapaensis
Dryopteris chinensis
Dryopteris chrysocoma
Dryopteris cinnamomea – cinnamon wood fern
Dryopteris clintoniana – Clinton's wood fern
Dryopteris confertipinna
Dryopteris cordipinna
Dryopteris corleyi
Dryopteris costalisora
Dryopteris crassirhizoma
Dryopteris crinalis
Dryopteris crispifolia
Dryopteris cristata – crested buckler fern
Dryopteris cyatheoides
Dryopteris cycadina
Dryopteris cyclopeltiformis
Dryopteris decipiens
Dryopteris dehuaensis
Dryopteris dickinsii
Dryopteris dilatata – broad buckler fern
Dryopteris discrita
Dryopteris enneaphylla
Dryopteris erythrosa
Dryopteris erythrosora – autumn fern
Dryopteris expansa – northern buckler fern
Dryopteris fibrilosa
Dryopteris fibrilosissima
Dryopteris filix-mas – male fern
Dryopteris floridana
Dryopteris formosana
Dryopteris fragrans – fragrant buckler fern, fragrant wood fern
Dryopteris fructuosa
Dryopteris fuscipes
Dryopteris gamblei
Dryopteris goerigiana
Dryopteris goldieana – Goldie's wood fern
Dryopteris gongboensis
Dryopteris guanchica
Dryopteris gushanica
Dryopteris gushiangensis
Dryopteris gymnophylla
Dryopteris gymnosora
Dryopteris hasseltii
Dryopteris hendersoni
Dryopteris hirtipes
Dryopteris huanganshanensis
Dryopteris hupehensis
Dryopteris hwangii
Dryopteris hypophlebia
Dryopteris immixta
Dryopteris inaequalis 
Dryopteris incisolobata
Dryopteris integriloba
Dryopteris integripinnula
Dryopteris intermedia – intermediate wood fern
Dryopteris junlianensis
Dryopteris juxtaposita
Dryopteris kinkiensis
Dryopteris labordei
Dryopteris lacera
Dryopteris lancipinnula
Dryopteris lepidopoda
Dryopteris lepidorachis
Dryopteris liyangensis
Dryopteris ludoviciana – southern wood fern
Dryopteris macropholis
Dryopteris manshurica
Dryopteris marginalis – marginal wood fern
Dryopteris matsumurae
Dryopteris minjiangensis
Dryopteris monticola
Dryopteris montigena
Dryopteris nanpingensis
Dryopteris neolepidopoda
Dryopteris nigropaleacea
Dryopteris nigrosquamosa
Dryopteris nyalamensis
Dryopteris nyingchiensis
Dryopteris odontoloma
Dryopteris oreades – mountain male fern
Dryopteris pacifica
Dryopteris pallida
Dryopteris paludicda
Dryopteris panda
Dryopteris parasparsa
Dryopteris pedata
Dryopteris peninsulae
Dryopteris podophylla
Dryopteris polita
Dryopteris prosa
Dryopteris pseudo-sikkimensis
Dryopteris pseudoatrata
Dryopteris pseudodontoloma
Dryopteris pseudofibrillosa
Dryopteris pseudomarginata
Dryopteris pseudouniformis
Dryopteris pulcherrima
Dryopteris qandoensis
Dryopteris quatanensis
Dryopteris reflexosquamata
Dryopteris remota – scaly buckler fern
Dryopteris rigida
Dryopteris rosthornii
Dryopteris sacrosancta
Dryopteris saxifraga
Dryopteris scottii
Dryopteris semipinnata
Dryopteris sericea
Dryopteris serrato-dentata
Dryopteris shensicola
Dryopteris shibipedis
Dryopteris sichotensis
Dryopteris sieboldii
Dryopteris sikkimensis
Dryopteris silaensis
Dryopteris sino-sparsa
Dryopteris sinoerythrosora
Dryopteris sinofibrillosa
Dryopteris sordidipes
Dryopteris sparsa
Dryopteris squamifera
Dryopteris squamiseta
Dryopteris stenolepis
Dryopteris subatrata
Dryopteris subbarbigera
Dryopteris subexaltata
Dryopteris sublacera
Dryopteris sublaeta
Dryopteris submarginata
Dryopteris submontana – rigid buckler fern
Dryopteris subtriangularis
Dryopteris tarningensis
Dryopteris tenuicula
Dryopteris tenuissima
Dryopteris thibetica
Dryopteris tieluensis
Dryopteris tokyoensis – Tokyo wood fern
Dryopteris tsangpoensis
Dryopteris tyrrhena
Dryopteris uniformis
Dryopteris varia
Dryopteris venosa
Dryopteris villarii
Dryopteris wallichiana – alpine wood fern
Dryopteris wenchuanensis
Dryopteris wuyishanensis
Dryopteris yigongensis
Dryopteris yungtzeensis
Dryopteris zayuensis

Ecology
Dryopteris species are used as food plants by the larvae of some Lepidoptera species including Batrachedra sophroniella (which feeds exclusively on D. cyatheoides) and Sthenopiseauratus.

Cultivation and uses
Many Dryopteris species are widely used as garden ornamental plants, especially D. affinis, D. erythrosora, and D. filix-mas, with numerous cultivars.

Dryopteris filix-mas was throughout much of recent human history widely used as a vermifuge, and was the only fern listed in the U.S. Pharmacopoeia.
Traditional use in Scandinavia against red mite (Dermanyssus gallinae) infestation is to place fronds in nesting boxes under nesting material and under floor covering material.

See also
North American Dryopteris hybrid complex

References

External links

 Flora Europaea: Dryopteris
 Flora of North America: Dryopteris
 Flora of China: Dryopteris species list

 
Fern genera